The Pebbly Arkose Formation is a Late Triassic geologic formation found in southern Africa.

Geology

Description 
The formation comprises mainly coarse, arkosic sandstones.

Extent 
The Pebbly Arkose Formation is found in Botswana, Zambia and Zimbabwe, in the Mid-Zambezi, Mana Pools, Cabora Bassa and Limpopo basins.

Deposition

Age

Stratigraphy 
The Pebbly Arkose Formation is part of the Upper Karoo Group, overlies the  Escarpment formation (in the Mid-Zambezi and Limpopo basins) and the Angwa Sandstone Formation (in the Mana Pools and Cabora Bassa Basins) and underlies the Forest Sandstone Formation.

The Pebbly Arkose has been correlated to the Elliot Formation of the Great Karroo Basin, South Africa and the Mpandi Formation of the Thuli Basin in Botswana and Zimbabwe.

Fossil content

Flora

Vertebrate fauna

See also 
 List of dinosaur-bearing rock formations
 List of stratigraphic units with indeterminate dinosaur fossils
 List of fossiliferous stratigraphic units in Zimbabwe
 Geology of Zimbabwe
 Molteno Formation

References

Bibliography 
 

Geologic formations of Botswana
Geologic formations of Zambia
Geologic formations of Zimbabwe
Triassic System of Africa
Carnian Stage
Sandstone formations
Alluvial deposits
Paleontology in Zimbabwe